Samsung Sens (branded as Samsung Electronics Notebook System, and stylized as SENS) is the notebook computer series made by Samsung Electronics. Samsung notebooks are designed similarly to the Acer Aspire, Asus Transformer and Zenbook, Dell Inspiron, HP Pavilion, Stream and Envy series, Lenovo IdeaPad and Toshiba Satellite. While they were available in many countries, the Sens notebook line were for some years now sold in the United States and Canada. However, in mid-October 2008, Samsung announced that it would be re-launching its Sens notebooks on the US market.

Series
There are 15 series of Sens laptops and 2-in-1s: E, M, N, Notebook 7, Notebook 9, P, Q, QX, R, RC, RF, RV, SF, X and G.

E Series

E3520

M Series
M- This series includes laptop computers with large screens (17"~19") and faster processors (Core 2 Duo), graphic cards, etc. For example: M50, M55, M70.

N Series
N- This is Samsung's newly launched netbook line-up, with the emphasis on keeping size, weight and cost to a minimum. The first N-series model worldwide is the Sens NC10. They continue their N line with NF line.

Notebook 7 Series

Notebook 7-  The Samsung Notebook 7 spin (13-inch) and Samsung Notebook 7 spin (15-inch) are 2-in-1 notebooks with a 13-inch and 15-inch touchscreen and Intel Core i5 and i7 processors and graphic cards, etc.

Notebook 9 Series

Notebook 9- The Samsung Notebook 9 spin is a 2-in-1 notebook with a 13-inch touchscreen and Intel Core i7 processor.

P Series
P- This Sens was a mainstream notebook - a kind that is noted with the characteristics of being fair in price, heavy, short in battery life, and thick. But now, it is in the process of being discontinued in many countries.

Q Series
Q- This series is an ultraportable, or at least they are quite light laptops. It has the characteristics of portable laptops: long battery life, small screen size, rather thin and light. Q series includes Q30(Also Sold as Dell Latitude X1), Q40(Core Solo), Q35(Core 2 Duo or Celeron M), and UMPCs, Q1 and Q1 Ultra. Recently, the 13.3" screen Q70 was released bringing a new maximum screen size into the Q range. Both the Q70 and 12.1" Q45 introduce the Santa Rosa platform in Samsung notebooks. They continue their Q line with QX line.

Q330

Q430

Q530

QX Series

QX310

QX311

QX410

QX411

QX412

QX510

QX511

R Series
R- This is the new mainstream line-up after P. It includes somewhat heavier and faster laptops, in fair prices. Its models include R45, R50, R65, etc.(discontinued) or R40(budget Core 2 Duo laptop), R55/R70(high-end), R19/R20. For new Samsung laptops having Core i Series CPUs, they use RF line instead of R line.

R480

R580

R780

R590

RC Series

RC410

RC420

RC510

RC512

RC710

RC720

RC530

RC730

RF Series

RF410

RF411

RF510

RF710

RF511

RF711

RF712

RV Series

RV409

RV411

RV413

RV415

RV511

RV515

RV420

RV520

RV711

RV720

SF Series

SF310

SF311

SF410

SF411

SF510

SF511

X Series
X- This Sens is a thin and light notebook - a kind that shares the characteristics of an ultraportable with exception of being heavier, wider in screen size, and stronger in processing power. It is around 14 inches, such as X06, X1(discontinued) and X11(Core 2 Duo). From i-series CPUs, they continue X series with SF series.

G Series
Sens also has G models, which are laptops without batteries, or to be exact, mobile desktops. It is a budget PC series being very heavy in weight and low processing power. It has two models, G10 and G15.

References

External links
  

Samsung laptops
Consumer electronics brands
Sens